The Copa Energil C was a football competition organized by the Federação Paulista de Futebol (FPF) created for clubs that failed to qualify for the 2007 Copa FPF edition. The competition did not serve as a qualifier for any national championship, with only a prize of R$ 30,000 for the champions and R$10,000 for the runner-up.

Participants 

Participation was open to all clubs not classified for the FPF Cup, however only 8 clubs were interested in the dispute:

Format 
The championship was disputed in a double round-robin system, with the four best placed team advancing to the semifinals (1°×4°, 2°×3°) and the two winners advancing to the finals.

First stage

Knockout stage

References

2007 in Brazilian football
Football in São Paulo